Jalan Labu Kubong (Perak state route A16) is a major road in Perak, Malaysia.

List of junctions

Labu Kubong